Psion or Psions may refer to:

Fiction
 Psion (comics), an alien race in stories from DC Comics

Literature
Psion, a fictitious "unit of mental energy" in the 1951 novella The Greatest Invention by Jack Williamson
 Psion, a person with psionic abilities
 Psion, a 1982 novel by Joan D. Vinge
 Psion (想子), a fictional substanceless particle and psychic phenomenon, the basis of magic in The Irregular at Magic High School
 Rhon psion (or Ruby psion), a group of telepaths in the Saga of the Skolian Empire novels

Video gaming
 Psion (role-playing games) a character with in role-playing games
 Psion (Dungeons & Dragons), a character class in Dungeons & Dragons
 Psions (Freedom City), a fictional adversary group in Freedom City
 Psions, a fictional group in the game Adventure!
 Psion, an alien species with extraordinary powers assimilated by the Cabal Empire in the video games Destiny and Destiny 2
 Psion, a species of enemy in the video game Into the Breach

Science
 Psion, the J/ψ meson (discovered 1974)

Computing
 Psion (company), a manufacturer of handheld computer devices
 Psion Organiser
 Psion Series 3
 Psion Siena
 Psion Series 5
 Psion Revo
 Psion netBook
 Psion Series 7

See also
 Psi (disambiguation)
 Psyche (disambiguation)
 Psychic (disambiguation)
 Psychotronics (disambiguation)